Jukka Matti Rauhala (born March 1, 1959 in Muurame) is a former wrestler from Finland, who claimed the bronze medal in the Men's Freestyle Lightweight Division (– 68 kg) at the 1984 Summer Olympics in Los Angeles.

He's married to Jaana, with whom he has son Jaakko and daughter Johanna.

On 18 March 2013 he was chosen to European Council of Associated Wrestling board of directors.

Results
1980 European Championship — 62.0 kg Freestyle (11th)
1981 European Championship — 68.0 kg Freestyle (4th)
1982 European Championship — 68.0 kg Freestyle (5th)
1983 World Championship — 68.0 kg Freestyle (10th)
1986 European Championship — 68.0 kg Freestyle (4th)
1986 World Championship — 68.0 kg Freestyle (5th)
1987 European Championship — 68.0 kg Freestyle (4th)
1987 World Championship — 68.0 kg Freestyle (11th)
1988 European Championship — 68.0 kg Freestyle (14th)

References

External links
 

1959 births
Living people
People from Muurame
Olympic wrestlers of Finland
Wrestlers at the 1984 Summer Olympics
Wrestlers at the 1988 Summer Olympics
Finnish male sport wrestlers
Olympic bronze medalists for Finland
Olympic medalists in wrestling
Medalists at the 1984 Summer Olympics
Sportspeople from Central Finland